Mary Shaw may refer to:

Mary Shaw (contralto) (1814–1876), English classical contralto of concerts and operas
Mary Shaw (actress) (1854–1929), American actress, suffragette, early feminist, and playwright
Mary Shaw (computer scientist) (born 1943), American software engineer
Mary Turner Shaw (1906–1990), Australian architect